Jatindra Nath Das (27 October 1904 – 13 September 1929), better known as Jatin Das, was an Indian independence activist and revolutionary who worked to make India independent from the British Raj and was a member of the Hindustan Socialist Republican Association. He died in the Lahore Central Jail after a 63-day hunger strike.

Early life
Das was born in 1904 in family at Calcutta. He passed the matriculation and intermediate examinations in the First Division. He joined the Anushilan Samiti, a revolutionary group in Bengal, and also participated in Mahatma Gandhi's non-cooperation movement in 1921, aged 17. In November 1925, while studying for a B.A. at Bangabasi College in Calcutta, Das was arrested for his political activities and was imprisoned at the jail in Mymensingh. While interned there, he went on a hunger strike to protest the ill-treatment meted out to the political prisoners. After fasting for twenty days, the jail's superintendent apologised and he gave up the fast. Sachindra Nath Sanyal taught him how to make bombs.

On 14 June 1929, he was again arrested for revolutionary activities and was imprisoned in Lahore Jail to be tried under the supplementary Lahore Conspiracy Case.

Hunger strike
In Lahore Jail, Das began another hunger strike along with other revolutionary fighters, demanding equality for Indian political prisoners with those from Europe. The conditions of Indian inhabitants of the jails was deplorable. The uniforms that Indian prisoners were required to wear in jail with were not washed for several days, and rats and cockroaches roamed the kitchen area making the food unsafe to eat. Indian prisoners were not provided with any reading material such as newspapers, nor paper to write on. The condition of the British prisoners in the same jail was strikingly different.

Das's hunger strike started on 13 July 1929 and lasted 63 days. The jail authority took measures to forcibly feed him and the other independence activists. Eventually, the jail authority recommended his unconditional release, but the government rejected the suggestion and offered to release him on bail.

Death and aftermath 
Das died on 13 September 1929. Durgawati Devi led the funeral procession, which went from Lahore to Calcutta by train. Thousands of people rushed to the railway stations to pay homage to Das. A two-mile long procession in Calcutta carried the coffin to the cremation ground. It was Subhash Chandra Bose, who received the coffin of Das at Howrah railway station and led the funeral procession to the cremation ground. The hunger strike of Das in prison was one crucial moment in the resistance against illegal detentions. 

After his death, the Viceroy informed London that "Mr. Das of the Conspiracy Case, who was on hunger strike, died this afternoon at 1 p.m. Last night, five of the hunger strikers gave up their hunger strike. So, there are only Bhagat Singh and Batukeshwar Dutt who are on strike."

Tributes were paid by almost every leader in the country. Mohammad Alam and Gopi Chand Bhargava resigned from the Punjab Legislative Council in protest. Motilal Nehru proposed the adjournment of the Central Assembly as a censure against the inhumanity of the Lahore prisoners. The censure motion was carried by 55 votes against 47. Jawaharlal Nehru said "Another name has been added to the long and splendid roll of Indian martyrs. Let us bow our heads and pray for strength to act to carry on the struggle, however long it may be and whatever consequences, till the victory is ours ".  

Bose described Das as the "young Dadhichi of India", referring to the well known mythological yogi Dadhichi who sacrificed his life for the sake of killing a demon.

Popular culture
Tamil writer Ki. Rajanarayanan's semi-historical novel Gopallapurathu Makkal (1989) makes a reference to Das.

In the 2002 film The Legend of Bhagat Singh, the character of Das was played by Amitabh Bhattacharjee. A 35-minute documentary film titled Immortal Martyr Jatin Das was released in 2009.

See also
 Batukeshwar Dutt
 Pritilata Waddedar
 Potti Sreeramulu
 Thileepan
 Bhagat Singh 
 Chandra Shekhar Azad
 Bagha Jatin

References

Further reading

External links

Indian Post article
The Pioneer article by Balbir Punj

Anushilan Samiti
1904 births
1929 deaths
Revolutionary movement for Indian independence
People from Kolkata
People who died on hunger strike
Indian revolutionaries
Vidyasagar College alumni
University of Calcutta alumni
Indian independence activists from West Bengal
Prisoners and detainees of British India
Indian people who died in prison custody